Crommelin is an impact crater in the Oxia Palus quadrangle of Mars, located at 5.1°N  latitude and 10.2°W  longitude. It is 113.9  km in diameter. It was named after British astronomer Andrew Crommelin (1865–1939), and the name was approved in 1973 by the International Astronomical Union (IAU) Working Group for Planetary System Nomenclature (WGPSN).

Description

The crater shows many layers.  Many places on Mars show rocks arranged in layers. Rock can form layers in a variety of ways.  Volcanoes, wind, or water can produce layers.  Groundwater may have been involved in the formation of layers in some places.

Parts of Crommelin crater display many thin layers.  These may reflect different climates in the past—some of which were much wetter.

Many craters once contained lakes.  Because some crater floors  show deltas, we know that water had to be present for some time.  Dozens of deltas have been spotted on Mars.   Deltas form when sediment is washed in from a stream entering a quiet body of water.  It takes a bit of time to form a delta, so the presence of a delta is exciting; it means water was there for a time, maybe for many years.  Primitive organisms may have developed in such lakes; hence, some craters may be prime targets for the search for evidence of life on the Red Planet.

The density of impact craters is used to determine the surface ages of Mars and other solar system bodies.   The older the surface, the more craters present.  Crater shapes can reveal the presence of ground ice.

The area around craters may be rich in minerals.  On Mars, heat from the impact melts ice in the ground.  Water from the melting ice dissolves minerals, and then deposits them in cracks or faults that were produced with the impact. This process, called hydrothermal alteration, is a major way in which ore deposits are produced.  The area around Martian craters may be rich in useful ores for the future colonization of Mars.

Gallery

See also
 List of craters on Mars

References

Further reading
 Grotzinger, J. and R. Milliken (eds.).  2012.  Sedimentary Geology of Mars.  SEPM.

Oxia Palus quadrangle
Impact craters on Mars